The Mars program was a series of uncrewed spacecraft launched by the Soviet Union between 1960 and 1973. The spacecraft were intended to explore Mars, and included flyby probes, landers and orbiters.

Early Mars spacecraft were small, and launched by Molniya rockets. Starting with two failures in 1969, the heavier Proton-K rocket was used to launch larger 5 tonne spacecraft, consisting of an orbiter and a lander to Mars. The orbiter bus design was likely somewhat rushed into service and immature, considering that it performed very unreliably in the Venera variant after 1975. This reliability problem was common to much Soviet space hardware from the late 1960s and early 1970s and was largely corrected with a deliberate policy, implemented in the mid-1970s, of consolidating (or "debugging") existing designs rather than introducing new ones.  The names of the "Mars" missions do not need to be translated, as the word "Mars" is spelled and pronounced approximately the same way in English and Russian.

In addition to the Mars program, the Soviet Union also sent a probe to Mars as part of the Zond program; Zond 2, however it failed en route. Two more spacecraft were sent during the Phobos program; both failed. In 1996, Russia launched Mars 96, its first interplanetary mission since the dissolution of the Soviet Union, however it failed to depart Earth orbit.

Spacecraft

Mars 1M

The first Soviet attempts to send a probe to Mars were the two Mars 1M spacecraft, which each had a mass of about 650 kg. Both were launched in 1960 and failed to achieve orbit.  The spacecraft were dubbed Marsnik by the Western media.

Mars 2MV

Mars 1 was launched in 1962 but failed en route to Mars. Two other Soviet launches at around the same time, Mars 2MV-4 No.1 and Mars 2MV-3 No.1 were  spacecraft, however both failed to leave Earth orbit due to problems with the upper stages of their carrier rockets.

Mars 2M
They were launched by Proton-K rockets, and consisted of orbiters. Both were destroyed during launch.

Mars 4M
The Mars 4M spacecraft; Mars 2 and Mars 3 missions consisted of identical spacecraft, each with an orbiter and an attached lander, which became the first spacecraft to reach the surface of Mars.

The orbiters' primary scientific objectives were to image the Martian surface and clouds, determine the temperature on Mars, study the topography, composition and physical properties of the surface, measure properties of the atmosphere, monitor the solar wind and the interplanetary and Martian magnetic fields, and act as communications relays to send signals from the landers to Earth.

Mars 2

Launch date/time:
Mars 2: May 19, 1971 at 16:22:44 UTC
Launch mass (including fuel):
Combined: 4650 kg
Orbiter: 3440 kg
Lander: 1210 kg
On-orbit dry mass: 2265 kg
Dimensions: 4.1 meters tall, 2 meters across (5.9 meters across with solar panels deployed)

Mars 2 released the descent module 4.5 hours before reaching Mars on November 27, 1971. The descent module entered the Martian atmosphere at roughly 6.0 km/s at a steeper angle than planned. Meanwhile, the orbiter engine performed a burn to put the spacecraft into a 1380 x 24,940 km, 18‑hour orbit about Mars with an inclination of 48.9 degrees. Scientific instruments were generally turned on for about 30 minutes near periapsis.

Mars 3

Launch date/time:
Mars 3: May 28, 1971 at 15:26:30 UTC
Launch mass (including fuel):
Combined: 4650 kg
Orbiter: 3440 kg
Lander: 1210 kg
On-orbit dry mass: 2265 kg
Dimensions: 4.1 meters tall, 2 meters across (5.9 meters across with solar panels deployed)

Mars 3's descent module was released at 09:14 UT on December 2, 1971, 4 hours 35 minutes before reaching Mars. The descent module entered the Martian atmosphere at roughly 5.7 km/s. However, after 20 seconds the instruments stopped working for unknown reasons, perhaps as a result of the massive surface dust storms raging at the time of landing. Mars 3 lander still managed to transmit a portion of the first picture of Martian surface. Meanwhile, the orbiter had suffered from a partial loss of fuel and did not have enough to put itself into a planned 25-hour orbit. The engine instead performed a truncated burn to put the spacecraft into a long 12-day-19-hour period orbit about Mars with an inclination thought to be similar to that of Mars 2 (48.9 degrees).

Both landers had a small Mars 'rover' on board, which would move across the surface on skis while connected to the lander with a 15-meter umbilical. Two small metal rods were used for autonomous obstacle avoidance, as radio signals from Earth would take too long to drive the rovers using remote control. Each rover had both a densitometer and a dynamic penetrometer, to test the density and the bearing strength of the soil. Because of the demise of the landers, neither rover saw action.

The Mars 2 and 3 orbiters sent back a large volume of data covering the period from December 1971 to March 1972, although transmissions continued through August. It was announced that Mars 2 and 3 had completed their missions by August 22, 1972, after 362 orbits completed by Mars 2 and 20 orbits by Mars 3. The probes sent back a total of 60 pictures. The images and data enabled creation of surface relief maps, and gave information on the Martian gravity and magnetic fields.

Mars 3MS

Kosmos 419 was launched on May 5, 1971. It consisted of only an orbiter, and was intended to become the first spacecraft to orbit Mars (areocentric orbit), thereby beating the American Mariner 8 and Mariner 9 spacecraft. Due to an upper stage malfunction, it failed to depart low Earth orbit.

The Mars 4 and Mars 5 orbiters, launched in 1973, were designed to orbit Mars and return information on the composition, structure, and properties of the Martian atmosphere and surface. The spacecraft were also designed to act as communications links to the Mars 6 and 7 landers. Like earlier heavy spacecraft, they were launched by Proton-K rockets.

Mars 4

Launch date/time:
Mars 4: July 21, 1973 at 19:30:59 UTC
On-orbit mass:
Dry: 2270 kg
Fully fuelled: 3440 kg

The Mars 4 orbiter reached Mars on February 10, 1974. Due to a flaw in the transistor 2Т-312 which resulted in its degradation during the voyage to Mars, the retro-rockets designed to slow the craft into Mars orbit did not fire, and Mars 4 flew by the planet at a range of 2200 km. It returned one swath of pictures and some radio occultation data which constituted the first detection of the nightside ionosphere on Mars. It continued to return interplanetary data from heliocentric orbit after the flyby.

Mars 5

Launch date/time:
Mars 5: July 25, 1973 at 18:55:48 UTC
On-orbit mass:
Dry: 2270 kg
Fully fuelled: 3440 kg

Mars 5 reached Mars on February 12, 1974 at 15:45 UT and was inserted into an elliptical 1755 by 32,555 km, 24 h 53 min orbit with an inclination of 35.3 degrees. Nearly synchronized with the rotation of the planet, its two phototelevision cameras could be commanded to take 12 pictures during each close approach. The Vega camera used a wide area 52mm lens with color filters, the Zulfar camera used a telescopic 350mm lens and long-pass orange filter. Images were transmitted in a rapid 220-line mode, and then selected pictures were retransmitted at 880 or 1760 line resolution. Mars 5 collected data for 22 orbits until a loss of pressurization in the transmitter housing ended the mission.

Mars 3MP
In 1973 the speed required to place a spacecraft in an interplanetary trajectory had to be increased.  Thus the Proton could not deliver spacecraft with an orbiter and an attached lander to the necessary trajectory to reach Mars, as had been possible in 1971. To resolve this problem, four spacecraft were launched. The Mars 4 and 5 orbiters, which had been launched separately, were used to relay communications, and to complete mission objectives which would have been completed by landers. Two landers were launched with orbiter type buses (Mars 6 and 7), but without fuel to enter orbit of the Mars satellite.

Mars 6

Mars 6 successfully lifted off on August 5, 1973, into an intermediate Earth orbit on a Proton-K/D booster and then launched into a Mars transfer trajectory. Total fueled launch mass of the lander and bus was 3260 kg. It reached Mars on March 12, 1974. The descent module separated from the bus at a distance of 48,000 km from Mars. The bus continued on into a heliocentric orbit after passing within 1600 km of Mars. The descent module entered the atmosphere at 09:05:53 UT at a speed of 5.6 km/s. The parachute opened at 09:08:32 UT after the module had slowed its speed to 600 m/s by aerobraking. During this time the craft was collecting data and transmitting it directly to the bus for immediate relay to Earth. Contact with the descent module was lost at 09:11:05 UT in "direct proximity to the surface", probably either when the retrorockets fired or when it hit the surface at an estimated 61 m/s. The landed mass was 635 kg. The descent module transmitted 224 seconds of data before transmissions ceased, the first data returned from the atmosphere of Mars. Much of the data was unreadable due to a flaw in a transistor which led to degradation of the system during its journey to Mars.

Mars 7

Mars 7 successfully lifted off on August 9, 1973, into an intermediate Earth orbit on a Proton-K/D booster and then launched into a Mars transfer trajectory. Total fueled launch mass of the lander and bus was 3260 kg. It reached Mars on March 9, 1974. Due to a problem in the operation of one of the on-board systems (attitude control or retro-rockets) the landing probe separated prematurely (4 hours before encounter) and missed the planet by 1300 km. The early separation was probably due to a computer error which resulted from degradation of the systems during the trip to Mars. The lander and bus continued on into heliocentric orbits.

Mars 4NM and 5NM

The Mars 4NM and Mars 5NM projects would have seen heavier spacecraft launched by N1 rockets. They would have deployed heavy Marsokhod rovers onto the surface, and conducted sample return missions. The N1 failed on all four of its test flights, and was never used to launch any Mars spacecraft.

Mars 5M

Mars 5M (Mars 79) was a sample return mission developed in 1977 to be double launched in 1979 by Proton launchers and then docked in Earth orbit for a joint flight of orbital and return modules to Mars. The project was canceled due to the low reliability of the Igla automatic docking system.

See also

Exploration of Mars
Space exploration
Robotic spacecraft

References

External links

 NSSDC Mars 5 page
 catalog of Soviet Mars images
 NASA's mars probe website
 Mars Series (USSR) Profile by NASA's Solar System Exploration
 Ted Stryk's page on the Mars 4-7 probes
 TASS notice on the Mars-3 landing (in Russian) (Wikisource)
 "The Rocky Soviet Road to Mars" by Larry Klaes - EJASA October, 1989
 "The Difficult Road to Mars" By V. G. Perminov